Kayenta is a U.S. town which is part of the Navajo Nation and is in Navajo County, Arizona, United States. Established November 13, 1986, the Kayenta Township is the only "township" existing under the laws of the Navajo Nation, making it unique in this way.

The population was 5,189 at the 2010 census. Like other places on the Navajo Nation, it is illegal to serve alcohol. Arizona does not observe Daylight Time; however, the Navajo reservation does.

Kayenta Township is the only municipal-style government on the Navajo Nation. It is regarded as a political sub-division of the Navajo Nation. It is managed by a five-member elected town board, which hires the township manager.

Kayenta is the name for the Chapter, as well as the township. Kayenta Chapter (a political division within the Navajo Nation that is analogous to a county within a state) encompasses land in both Utah and Arizona. Thus, the Navajo Nation's census figures for Kayenta Chapter are significantly different from those of Kayenta proper.

Geography

Kayenta is located at  (36.7118, -110.2505), at an elevation of 5,700 feet, (1,738 m).

Climate
According to the Köppen Climate Classification system, Kayenta has a semi-arid climate, abbreviated "BSk" on climate maps.

Demographics

As of the census of 2010, there were 5,189 people. The racial makeup of the CDP was 92.3% Native American, 4.6% White, 0.2% Black or African American, 0.2% Asian, <0.1% Pacific Islander, 0.3% from other races, and 2.5% from two or more races.  2.0% of the population were Hispanic or Latino of any race.

In the CDP, the population was spread out, with 38.9% under the age of 18, 11.4% from 18 to 24, 11.9% from 25 to 34, 33.2% from 35 to 64, and 4.7% who were 65 years of age or older. The median age was 22 years. For every 100 females, there were 90.7 males.

Events
The Kayenta Fourth of July Rodeo is an annual multi-day event taking place from July 1–4. Various events take place daily, while the "Best of the Best" and a fireworks show take place on the fourth. The Kayenta Fourth of July Rodeo has been recognized six times as the Rodeo of the Year and twice as the Outstanding Rodeo by the All Indian Rodeo Cowboys Association, making it one of the premier rodeos to attend in the Southwest.

Education

Kayenta is served by the Kayenta Unified School District. There are several KUSD schools that serve the community.  Kayenta Elementary School, Kayenta Middle School, and Monument Valley High School are the public schools.

Kayenta Community School, a K-8 school operated by the Bureau of Indian Education, The facility, also known as Kayenta Boarding School, is a boarding school serving both day and dormitory students.

Amenities

Restaurants
Kayenta is the home of several sit down and fast food restaurants, most of which are located at the junction between the 160 and the 163. In terms of fast food, Kayenta has a Burger King, Sonic Drive-In, Subway restaurant, and McDonald's. The Burger King uniquely houses a small museum dedicated to the Navajo Code Talkers of World War II. For casual dining there is the Golden Rice Bowl Chinese restaurant, Pizza Edge, Amigo Cafe, and The Blue Coffee Pot.

Groceries and shopping
A Bashas' Diné Market is located in Kayenta. Also found here are an Ace Hardware, a Video Plus movie rental store, as well as a Navajo Arts and Crafts store. Kayenta does lack any kind of general merchandise store, like Wal-Mart or Target, that sells clothing and other amenities. The closest location with those is Page.

Lodging
Kayenta has three hotels serving travelers and passersby; the Weatherill Inn (named after John and Louisa Wade Wetherill who established a trading post at Kayenta in 1910), Kayenta's Monument Valley Inn, and a Hampton Inn, with the latter two being on U.S. 160.

Local facilities
Kayenta has a large recreation center dedicated to serving the local community. Just outside the Recreation Center is a skating park, as well as an outdoor park with several playgrounds for children. Kayenta also has a movie theater, the Black Mesa Twin Cinema. On the east side of the community is a paved landing strip that can handle small single engine and twin engine aircraft used for air tours and air ambulance services.

Churches
Many religious organizations are represented in Kayenta. There are churches for Baptists, Presbyterian Church, Lamb of God Pentecostal Church, Potter's House Christian Church, Kayenta Church of Christ, The Living Word Assembly of God Church Assemblies of God, Catholic Church (Our Lady of Guadalupe), a meetinghouse for the Church of Jesus Christ of Latter-day Saints, and a Kingdom Hall for Jehovah's Witnesses. Also there is a Bible church located on the hill of Kayenta.

Miscellaneous
In terms of banking, there is a Wells Fargo located in Kayenta, as well as a Western Union, and an H&R Block. There is a U.S. post office in Kayenta. There is one movie rental location, a NAPA auto and truck parts store, and an Urban Trendz haircut place.

See also
Kayenta Formation
Monument Valley Film Festival
All Indian Rodeo Cowboys Association

References

External links

Kayenta Chapter website
Navajo Nation website

Census-designated places in Navajo County, Arizona
Populated places on the Navajo Nation
Old Spanish Trail (trade route)